Home BancShares, Inc., operating as Centennial Bank, is a bank holding company based in Conway, Arkansas. It is on the list of largest banks in the United States. The bank operates 222 branches in Arkansas, Alabama, Florida,Texas, and New York City.  They acquired Happy Bank in Texas earlier in 2022.

History
The bank was founded in 1999 as First State Bank by John W. Allison and Robert H. “Bunny” Adcock, Jr.

Acquisitions
2003: Community Bank, Cabot, Arkansas
2005: Bank of Mountain View, Mountain View, Arkansas
2005: Twin City Bank, North Little Rock, Arkansas
2005: Marine Bank, Marathon Key, Florida
2008: Centennial Bank, Little Rock, Arkansas
2010: Old Southern Bank, Orlando, Florida
2010: Key West Bank, Key West, Florida
2010: Coastal Community Bank, Panama City, Florida
2010: Bayside Savings Bank, Port St Joe, Florida
2010: Wakulla Bank, Crawfordsville, Florida
2010: Gulf State Community Bank, Carrabelle, Florida
2012: Vision Bank, Panama City, Florida
2012: Heritage Bank of Florida, Lutz, Florida
2012: Premier Bank, Tallahassee, Florida
2013: Liberty Bankshares/Liberty Bank, Jonesboro, Arkansas
2014: Florida Traditions Bank, Dade City, Florida
2014: Broward Financial Holdings/Broward Bank of Commerce, Ft Lauderdale, Florida
2015: Doral Bank, Florida; Pandhandle branches
2015: Florida Business BancGroup/Bay Cities Bank, Tampa, Florida
2017: Stonegate Bank, Pompano Beach, Florida 33062
2022: Happy State Bank

References

External links
 

1999 establishments in Arkansas
Banks based in Arkansas
American companies established in 1999
Banks established in 1999
Companies listed on the New York Stock Exchange